Barney Lebrowitz (June 10, 1891 – February 12, 1949), better known as Battling Levinsky, was an American boxer who was the world light heavyweight champion from 1916 to 1920.  Statistical boxing website BoxRec lists Levinsky as the #12 ranked light heavyweight of all-time, while The Ring Magazine founder Nat Fleischer placed him at #9. The International Boxing Research Organization rates Levinsky as the 20th best light heavyweight ever. He was inducted into the Ring Magazine Hall of Fame in 1966, the International Jewish Sports Hall of Fame in 1982, and the International Boxing Hall of Fame in 2000.

Early life
Born in Philadelphia on June 10, 1891, of Jewish immigrant parents from Russia, he shined shoes and sold newspapers after school to contribute to his family.  In his earliest boxing days, he sold jewelry during the day, but boxed in the evening at the clubs in Philadelphia, probably to hide his fledgling boxing career from his parents.

Boxing career

Career beginnings

Battling Levinsky began his boxing career under the name Barney Williams.  He fought his first recorded match in 1910 at Philadelphia's Diamond Lew Bailey's Broadway Athletic Club, with a first round knockout of his opponent, Mat Ryan, who outweighed him by over sixty pounds.  He received little attention until he took on "Dumb" Dan Morgan as his manager in 1913, who changed Barney's name along with his boxing fortunes.  He was known for possessing incredible defensive skills, not frequently winning by knockout, but often leaving the ring at the end of a fight without having received a truly damaging blow.

Morgan came up with his name of "Battling Levinsky" to obscure the fact that Barney's boxing style was actually more defensive than aggressive in order to give his opposition the impression that he was an aggressive puncher.

Because Levinsky first entered the pro ranks as Barney Williams around 1906, many of his fights between 1906 and 1910, when he became "Battling Levinsky", were not recorded by boxing publications, particularly Nat Fleischer's Ring Record Book.  He did not officially become "Battling Levinsky" until 1913. In his first 100 fights between 1910 and 1914, he lost only three of his bouts.

Between 1914 and 1918, Levinsky fought 127 times, averaging an impressive 37 fights a year, even for his era. Levinsky fought 37 times in 1914 — 9 times in the month of January alone.  In January 1915, he began the year with two 10-round bouts on New Year's Day — 1 each in Brooklyn,  New York City and 12 round bout in Waterbury, Connecticut.

World light heavyweight champion, 1916
After two title-match losses to world light heavyweight champion Jack Dillon, (April 1914 and April 1916), Levinsky finally wrested the crown from him on October 24, 1916, in a twelve-round points decision in Boston.  The new champion was believed by many to have won every round but the fifth which was even.  Levinsky had around a three inch advantage in height, a few extra inches in reach, and as much as a ten pound weight advantage.  Though he was not known as a strong puncher, his defensive skills were considered exceptional, and they weighed heavily in his victory.  His better blows were landed with his left, often to the jaw and body of Dillon.  Fatigued by the fifth, Levinsky carried the match after the sixth, landing blows to the face, jaw and body of Dillon, who landed only a few blows that usually lacked steam.  The referee's decision was met with approval by the fans. Some reporters speculated that Dillon's hands were still sore from his bout the previous night with Larry Williams, a very capable light heavyweight, in Philadelphia. Many of Dillon's blows were body punches, but he tried to go to the face or jaw on several occasions, often missing due to Levinsky's fluid defense.  Dillon's dangerous right, which landed on a few occasions in the second, usually glanced off Levinsky's face for the remainder of the bout, as the Philadelphia fighter showed his ability to move away from Dillon's most valuable blow, while occasionally countering with rapid left jabs.

Harry Greb defeated Levinsky in a somewhat close six round newspaper decision of a no decision bout on August 6, 1918, at Philadelphia's Shibe Park. Though the Wilkes-Barre Times Leader had Levinsky winning four of the six rounds, the majority of local papers had Levinsky winning the battle.  In their ten round bout in  Buffalo on February 17, 1919, Levinsky countered and blocked well against Greb's characteristic aggressive two handed attack, and the Pittsburgh Post wrote that the contest was "one of the most brilliant big glove exhibitions ever staged", but many local papers agreed with the Buffalo Enquirer, that "Greb won by his aggressive attack."

Levinsky met future champion Jack Dempsey on November 6, 1918, and lost in Philadelphia from a third round knockout administered by a left to the jaw.  Dempsey connected on several occasions in the first two rounds, landing short rights and lefts that seriously affected his opponent. Dempsey was particularly effective with his left, which he often followed with a right to the body.  Dempsey had an advantage in height, weight and reach, which he used to his benefit throughout the match. He was not bothered by Levinsky's frequently used left jabs, and set a very fast pace for Levinsky who at twenty-seven was a critical five years older.  By most records, it was the first time, Levinsky had ever lost a match by knockout.

Loss of light heavy title, 1920
On October 12, 1920, fifty-nine bouts later, and almost four years to the day after he took the title, he lost his championship in a fourth round knock out to France's enormously popular Georges Carpentier in Jersey City, New Jersey. Before a crowd of 15,000, after a series of rights and lefts from Carpentier, Levinsky lost his title as he fell from a heavy right to the jaw, one minute and seven seconds into the fourth round.  Levinsky received his largest purse of $25,000 for the fight. Carpentier had dominated the battle, and sent Levinsky down twice for counts of eight.  Struggling to rise after being counted out, the vanquished Levinsky had to be brought to his feet and partly carried to his corner by Jack Britton, who had assisted him with the bout.

Though not unique for his boxing era, Levinsky fought many of his opponents multiple times. According to historian Ken Blady, Levinsky fought Dillon a total of ten times in his career.  Perhaps his worthiest opponent, Nat Fleischer once rated Dillon the third greatest Light Heavyweight of all time while boxing promoter Charley Rose placed him at #2. Levinsky met Jim Flynn, the only man to ever knock out Jack Dempsey, and heavyweight "Porky" Flynn a total of nine times.  In his New York bout with Flynn on July 30, 1913, Levinsky's strong rally in the last round allowed him to end the match with a draw as Flynn had taken the third, fourth, seventh, eighth and ninth rounds.

Career record

In an era when the winners of bouts could not be decided by the votes of referees and boxing judges, and titles changed hands only in the case of a knockout, Levinsky fought all comers, including losses to future heavyweight champions Gene Tunney and Jack Dempsey.

He also fought the 1923 World Middleweight Champion Harry Greb at least three times between 1918 and 1919, successfully defending his Light Heavyweight title in each meeting.  Levinsky loved to fight, although his claim to having fought close to 500 bouts has not been fully substantiated.

His official professional record: 287 bouts – won 196 (30 KOs), lost 54, drew 37.

In his early career, Levinsky was managed by Fred Douglas (1910–11) and Jack Hanlon (1911–13), and then fell primarily under the management of Dan Morgan until 1922.  Al Lippe managed him in his comeback, from 1926 to 1929.

Life after boxing

After his loss to Gene Tunney on January 13, 1922, Levinsky attempted to retire from boxing and entered the Real Estate business.  Around 1926, he returned to the ring as a heavyweight after a series of financial losses and faced Tommy Madden, beginning his four-year comeback.  He fought around forty-two times in his comeback, losing only twelve matches.  After losing badly to Herman Weiner on January 15, 1929, he seriously discussed retirement before boxing one more time the following year in October 1930 in New York, beating Joe Simms in three rounds.

Levinsky's son Stanley was killed in the Battle of the Bulge, WWII.  His daughter Harriet, a graduate and valedictorian at West Philadelphia High School, currently resides in Lancaster, PA.  Levinsky's grandchildren are Stanley Solodky, Barry Solodky, and Susan Oldham.

Levinsky invested much of his total boxing winnings of $250,000 in real estate, but lost most of it in the Depression of the early 1930s.  During the height of the depression, in the mid-1930s Levinsky worked for the Works Progress Administration (WPA). After his retirement from the ring in 1930, he sold many of the remaining Apartment houses he owned, and purchased a Meat Slaughtering House in Chicago which he retained until around 1947, though continuing to live in Philadelphia.

After an illness of several months that had been aggravated by a car accident on January 17, Levinsky died at his home on February 12, 1949, in Philadelphia, Pennsylvania, at the age of 59.  He was buried at Har Zion Cemetery.

He was inducted into the Boxing Hall of Fame in 1966, and is in both the Pennsylvania Hall of Fame and Jewish Sports Hall of Fame in Israel.

Professional boxing record
All information in this section is derived from BoxRec, unless otherwise stated.

Official record

All newspaper decisions are officially regarded as "no decision" bouts and are not counted in the win/loss/draw column.

Unofficial record

Record with the inclusion of newspaper decisions in the win/loss/draw column.

See also
List of light heavyweight boxing champions
List of select Jewish boxers

References

External links
 
 Cyber Boxing Zone profile

1891 births
1949 deaths
Light-heavyweight boxers
Boxers from Philadelphia
American people of Russian-Jewish descent
Jewish American boxers
Jewish boxers
World light-heavyweight boxing champions
World boxing champions
American male boxers
20th-century American Jews